The Men's Slalom in the 2019 FIS Alpine Skiing World Cup involved 12 events, including two parallel slaloms (both city events}. Marcel Hirscher of Austria won his sixth championship in the discipline, all in the prior seven years, on the way to his eighth straight overall men's championship.  During the season, Hirscher had hinted at retiring after it, and before the start of the next season, he did announce his retirement. 

The season was interrupted by the 2019 World Ski Championships, which were held from 4–17 February in Åre, Sweden. The men's slalom was held on 17 February.

Standings
 

DNF1 = Did Not Finish run 1
DSQ1 = Disqualified run 1
DNQ = Did not qualify for run 2
DNF2 = Did Not Finish run 2
DSQ2 = Disqualified run 2
DNS = Did Not Start

See also
 2019 Alpine Skiing World Cup – Men's summary rankings
 2019 Alpine Skiing World Cup – Men's Overall
 2019 Alpine Skiing World Cup – Men's Downhill
 2019 Alpine Skiing World Cup – Men's Super-G
 2019 Alpine Skiing World Cup – Men's Giant Slalom
 2019 Alpine Skiing World Cup – Men's Combined
 World Cup scoring system

References

External links
 Alpine Skiing at FIS website

World Cup
FIS Alpine Ski World Cup slalom men's discipline titles